Gweal ( "place of trees") is one of the Isles of Scilly. It is the largest of the seven Norrard Rocks due west of Bryher. The name perhaps refers back to a time before most of the islands' area was inundated.

References

 Weatherhill, Craig Cornish Placenames and Language
 Ordnance Survey One-inch Map of Great Britain; Land's End, sheet 190. 1961

Uninhabited islands of the Isles of Scilly